MTL Trust Holdings was an English bus, coach and train operator based in Liverpool. MTL was originally part of the MPTE. To comply with the Transport Act 1985, the bus operations were divested into a new independent company, Merseyside Transport Limited (MTL). Merseyside PTA retained shareholding, but the company was purchased by its management and staff in 1993. On 17 February 2000, MTL was purchased by Arriva.

Railway operations

MTL was awarded two railway franchises in 1997, during the Privatisation of British Rail. Both franchises were taken over by Arriva in 2000.

Northern Spirit was a large franchise operating services across the whole of Yorkshire, including the Settle & Carlisle line and much of the North East. The franchise also included TransPennine Express trains from Liverpool and Blackpool to Scarborough, Hull and Newcastle. The franchise was rebranded as Arriva Trains Northern in April 2001.

Merseyrail Electrics was responsible for running the Merseyrail network in Merseyside. All services were subsidised by Merseytravel. The franchise was rebranded as Arriva Trains Merseyside in April 2001.

Bus operations
The original bus division, Merseybus, introduced several new brand names, many outside of Merseyside, expanding into Manchester, North London, Lancaster, Warrington and South Lancashire. The company also owned Sightseers, a coach holiday business and had a full ABTA travel agency, "The TravelShop", in Williamson Square, Liverpool and in Eastbank Street, Southport.

MTL Services employed many cleaning, maintenance and security staff in London and on Merseyside whilst MTL Engineering refurbished many hundreds of vehicles at the Edge Lane plant in Liverpool. The company subsequently expanded by acquiring local Merseyside bus operators Fareway Passenger Services of Kirkby and Liverbus of Huyton which by this time had grown to about 50 buses each. Subsequently, it purchased Blue Triangle of Bootle.

Merseybus

The principal branding for the former Merseyside Transport (PTE) bus operation from 26 October 1986, Merseybus encompassed the following depots and divisions:

Liverpool North Division - Gillmoss, Green Lane and Walton (Carisbroke Road, also known as Spellow Lane)
Liverpool South Division - Edge Lane, Garston (Speke Road) and Speke (Shaw Road, also known as Woodend Avenue)
St Helens Division - Jackson Street/Shaw Street.
Southport Division - Canning Road
Wirral Division - Birkenhead, Laird Street

Liverpool's Prince Alfred Road (Penny Lane), Litherland and Wallasey's Seaview Road depots were not transferred to Merseybus and remained with Merseyside PTE, ultimately being sold for redevelopment. Prior to this Merseyside PTE used these depots to store 'non-standard' vehicles Merseybus did not take on. These included a batch of five relatively modern Willowbrook-bodied Dennis Dominators that had been based at the Speke depot. Four were purchased by Maidstone & District, the other by Citybus of Hong Kong. Other notable types not operated by the privatised Merseybus included the East Lancs bodied Bristol VRs, many of which ended up with Merseybus's first notable competitor, Fareway Passenger Services, Scania Metropolitans and some life-expired Leyland Atlanteans and Nationals. However a significant proportion of the vehicles taken on by Merseybus were considerably older than these vehicles and included some of the K and most of the L-registration Alexander bodied Leyland Atlanteans dating from 1971 to 1973 and the increasing age profile of the Merseybus/MTL fleet - including the companies MTL would eventually acquire - would become a major issue for Merseybus/MTL right up to its acquisition by Arriva in 2000.

At the end of 1992, the Merseybus parent company Merseyside Transport Ltd was being prepared for sale by Merseyside PTA. Prior to this MerseyRider had been formed to operate Merseytravel contracts and compete with other operators at a lower cost structure - payscales in particular, than those within Merseybus. At the beginning of 1993 Merseybus was sold to its management and employees in a nearly £5.9 million Employee Share Ownership Plan, with all vehicles and property being transferred to a new company, MTL Trust Holdings.

Prior to the formation of MTL, the Merseybus fleet had aged significantly with the oldest Atlanteans - the mainstays of Merseybus fleet, now approaching 20 years of age or more. MTL therefore made a major effort to update the fleet throughout the 1990s in the form of:

A deal with London Buses to purchase approximately 250 mid-life Leyland Titans dating from 1978 to 1984 between 1992 and 1994
11 new Optare MetroRiders from 1992 to 1995
12 new Neoplan N4016 integral low-floor single deckers in 1994 - these vehicles were initially owned by Merseytravel and operated by Merseybus on SMART services in Liverpool
3 new Alexander Strider bodied Volvo B10Bs in 1994
120 new Wright Endurance bodied Volvo B10Bs from 1994 to 1996
36 new long-wheelbase Northern Counties Palatine II bodied Volvo Olympians in 1995/96 mainly for use on cross river services between Liverpool and Wirral
38 new Plaxton Pointer bodied Dennis Dart SLFs from 1995 to 1998
20 new Wright Axcess-Ultralow bodied Scania L113s in 1996
22 new Northern Counties Palatine II bodied Volvo Olympians in 1998 for operations based at Gillmoss depot in North Liverpool and branded The Millennium Fleet
4 new gas-powered Plaxton Pointer bodied Dennis Super Darts for use on park and ride services in Southport
75 new Marshall Capital bodied Dennis Dart SLFs in 1999

Fareway Passenger Services Ltd/MTL Fareway
Fareway Passenger Services was Merseyside's first major newcomer to bus operation in the post-deregulation period. It was established by four former Merseyside Transport bus drivers who re-mortgaged their homes and used the redundancy payments they received prior to the formation of Merseybus in 1986. Fareway commenced operations in January 1987 with a fleet of 15-20 ex-Merseyside Transport East Lancs bodied Bristol VRs on the F1 service between their depot at Hornhouse Lane on the Kirkby Industrial Estate to Liverpool's Pier Head. Prior to the arrival of Fareway, Merseybus had significantly increased the fare scales previously used by Merseyside Transport and reduced/withdrawn service levels on a number of routes across Merseyside. Fareway tapped into this by having fares significantly lower than Merseybus and plugging a gap with the F1 route along the popular Black Bull/County Road/Scotland Road corridor.

This was very popular with bus users in North Liverpool and Kirkby which at the time had high levels of unemployment and low levels of income and car ownership and the success of the F1 set the tone for Fareway's expansion. The F1 quickly gained 30-minute evening and Sunday operation and over the next 18 months Fareway expanded rapidly. 40-50 Northern Counties/Park Royal bodied Daimler Fleetlines originally new to Greater Manchester Transport entered the fleet along with 10 ex London Transport Fleetlines which came from Cumberland Motor Services as well as Fareway's first new vehicles, 10 Northern Counties bodied Leyland Olympians which arrived in 1988/89. Fareway's route network also expanded during this period and by the end 1989 Fareway had a core network 7 high frequency commercial services on the major bus corridors linking Kirkby and North Liverpool to Liverpool city centre and a number of Merseytravel contracts.

Merseybus was generally complacent to the competitive threat posed by Fareway and it took a while for it to respond. However, with its profitable routes under threat and passenger opinion becoming negative to Merseybus and more favourable to Fareway, it responded with a re-launch of its Kirkby and North Liverpool service network in the spring of 1988 with similar fare levels to those of Fareway, new services which mirrored Fareway's and increased frequencies. North Western also competed with Fareway on its F1 service using high frequency minibuses with Faresaver''' branding on a Monday to Saturday daytime from the summer of 1988. However North Western was unsuccessful and withdrew their F1 service by the autumn of 1989.

Despite this competition, Fareway would successfully maintain its network of services in Kirkby and North Liverpool for the next 2–3 years and modernised its fleet with newer ex-Greater Manchester Northern Counties bodied Leyland Fleetlines and four Northern Counties bodied Leyland Olympians new to London Buses' Bexleybus division in 1987, that were originally intended for GM Buses. In addition a coach excursion/private hire division was also established. However, by 1992 rumours began circulating that Fareway was in financial trouble and the once generally clean, well maintained fleet was starting to look tried and dirty. With Merseybus now part of MTL Trust Holdings and engaged in a programme of consolidation and expansion acquiring Fareway would naturally be of interest to MTL especially if Fareway was in financial difficulty and in the early spring of 1993, Fareway was acquired by MTL.

Initially MTL kept Fareway as a separate entity from the core Merseybus division maintaining the Fareway route network and its yellow and blue livery. The only sign of MTL ownership of Fareway were stickers for the SuperSaver season ticket that Merseybus had introduced in 1990, now also valid on Fareway services. Fareway was also a useful weapon for MTL to defend itself from GM Buses (North/South) who launched a network of commercial services in North Merseyside from September 1993 in retaliation to MTL's expansion in Greater Manchester with Lancashire Travel and MTL Manchester. However, by late 1993 MTL began to exert more influence over the Fareway operation.

The ex-Greater Manchester Fleetlines had started to become time expired and were replaced with newer Metro Cammell Weymann bodied Leyland Fleetlines from Busways Travel Services Some Eastern Coach Works and Northern Counties bodied Leyland Olympians and Leyland Nationals from the main Merseybus fleet were also drafted into Fareway along with three brand new Plaxton Pointer bodied Volvo B6s for use on Merseytravel contracts in Merseytravel livery. In the summer of 1995, MTL's corporate livery of cream and crimson relief replaced Fareway's yellow and blue livery. This was initially introduced to a batch of 10 new Wright Endurance bodied Volvo B10Bs branded for the F3 service along with a new fleetname MTL Fareway'''. MTL further updated the MTL Fareway fleet with a batch of ex-London Buses Leyland Titans from the main Merseybus fleet and secondhand MCW Metrobuses from Lancashire Travel.

Despite this next few years would see MTL gradually close down the MTL Fareway operation with the Northern Counties Leyland Olympians that were new to Fareway and Merseybus being transferred to Liverbus in 1996 and by the spring of 1997, what remained of the MTL Fareway was transferred to Merseybus and operated by their Gillmoss depot.

Merseymaid/Silver Service

Merseymaid and Silver Service were brand names for cross-river double-deck Merseybus services between Liverpool and the Wirral via the Mersey Tunnels. Initially, a Willowbrook bodied Leyland Atlantean and five Alexander R-Type Leyland Olympians were refurbished at the Edge Lane works with soft trim, internal address systems and coach seats in November 1992, before then operating on routes 410 and 411 from Eastham to Liverpool. To attract passengers, the drivers of 'Silver Service' buses were given special customer care training, while MTL advertised a weekly ticket lower than four days' tunnel toll fees. At the end of 1995, this operation was augmented with a batch of 30 similar specification Northern Counties Palatine II bodied Volvo Olympians, which were also used on other cross-river services. Silver Service branding was dropped inconspicuously during 1998.

Merseymini

Merseymini was a branding exercise for Merseybus's attempt at minibus operation. Merseymini used a fleet of Alexander and Northern Counties bodied Dodge S56s, including some bought secondhand from GM Buses, and its most notable routes were two Merseytravel contracts and two commercial services. Other services between Huyton, Old Swan and Belle Vale were quickly dropped and the Merseymini name quietly vanished around 1992, when the low-cost MerseyRider unit became more involved with minibus operation.

MerseyRider

MerseyRider began life in the autumn of 1992 as a low-cost operation set up by Merseybus a few months prior to the sale to privatisation. MerseyRider operated on lower margins and what would prove controversial pay-rates than Merseybus and initially operated out of Liverline's former Blackstock Street depot near Liverpool City Centre after Liverline had moved to a new depot in Bootle. Many of Merseybus's Merseytravel contracts were transferred to MerseyRider as well as Liverline's commercial service 102 (Walton/Broadway - Broadgreen Hospital). At first the fleet included Merseybus's remaining Willowbrook bodied Leyland Atlanteans and a number of hired minibuses which were replaced at the beginning of 1993 by new K-registration Marshall bodied Mercedes-Benz 811Ds and a handful of similar G-registration vehicles bodied by Carlyle and bought secondhand from Cambus. These vehicles were painted in a cream and green livery not dissimilar to the former Liverpool Corporation/Merseyside Transport scheme.

That same year MTL was keen to expand the MerseyRider operation on both marginal services and retain its position in Liverpool's hotly contested bus market. The operation was therefore transferred to the mothballed Shaw Road depot in Speke which Merseybus had vacated in 1989.

A substantial number of Merseybus's East Lancs bodied Leyland Atlanteans were transferred to MerseyRider, appearing at first in a maroon and silver variant of Merseybus's maroon livery then a rather more attractive silver and blue scheme until the adoption of MTL 'corporate' cream and crimson livery at the beginning of 1994. Additionally the operations of Blue Triangle were transferred to MerseyRider after MTL acquired that company in the spring of 1994 along with three Alexander Strider bodied Volvo B10Bs which were part of MTL's intake of new vehicles from 1994 to 1996.

MerseyRider, however, was creating conflict between MTL's management - who were keen to expand the operation further - and its employees and the unions, who were concerned about new drivers being on lower pay scales to those within the core Merseybus operation and a bonus scheme based on the takings of each individual driver - a major source of profitability for MTL's competitors. Unions finally called a series of strikes in 1994 and 1995 after the transfer of service 72 (Halewood - Liverpool City Centre) from Merseybus's Garston depot in South Liverpool to MerseyRider, with the effect that with the exception of MTL Fareway and ironically MerseyRider the entire MTL operation was off the road. MTL reconsidered its position and eventually brought the MerseyRider's terms and conditions in line with those of Merseybus, which compromised the profitability of the operation and subsequently it was closed. Some services were transferred to MTL Fareway and in August 1996 the MerseyRider operation ceased when MTL transferred the Garston depot of Merseybus to the Shaw Road depot in Speke.

Lancashire Travel
Between 1988 and 1993 Merseybus began expanding the network of services operated by its St Helens depot. At first these were to nearby Wigan but gradually a network of 'Merseybus' services began to appear in Bolton, Salford and Manchester. GM Buses was already under siege from a number of independent operators in Greater Manchester and the arrival of Merseybus/MTL in their established territory started a bus war between the two companies from 1993 until the summer of 1995. MTL launched a two-pronged attack on the Greater Manchester bus market. The first of which consisted of the creation of a new company, MTL Manchester, which had a depot in the Miles Platting area of Manchester and mainly focused on competing with GM Buses (North/South) on city corridors in Manchester and satellite towns such as Altrincham, Bury, Sale and Stockport.

The second phase of MTL's move into Greater Manchester was to rebrand the Merseybus services operated by the St Helens depot as Lancashire Travel in the autumn of 1993. In turn Lancashire Travel expanded on to much of the GM Buses (North) network of both local and interurban services in Bolton, Wigan, Leigh, Salford and North Manchester. To facilitate this the 1989 batch of 25 MCW Metrobus MkIIs were transferred from Merseybus's Gillmoss depot to St Helens along with some early model MkI Metrobuses, again from Gillmoss and a variety of secondhand sources including London Buses, Mainline Buses, Newport Transport and Yorkshire Rider. In addition MTL's first new vehicles, 13 Wright Endurance bodied Volvo B10Bs, were delivered to Lancashire Travel in the spring of 1994. These moves provoked GM Buses (North/South) to begin new services in Liverpool, Southport and the Wirral, the latter using a light blue and cream livery - not dissimilar to that of Birkenhead Corporation - and were branded Birkenhead & District.

However the moves by MTL and GM Buses (North/South) into Greater Manchester and Merseyside were highly unprofitable and as such a controversial 'gentlemen's agreement' was signed between MTL and GM Buses North/South in June 1995, which saw MTL pull out of much of Greater Manchester - with the exception of Wigan and Leigh near to Lancashire Travel's St Helens depot and GM Buses North/South from all of Merseyside - including its well established 34 (Liverpool - Manchester Express) and 320 (Liverpool - Wigan) services which severed some important links between the two conurbations. This agreement was subject to a 1995/96 Monopolies & Mergers Commission study which found MTL, GM Buses North/South, North Western and other Merseyside bus operators in collusion and in breach of fair trade resulting in fines for all concerned. By that time GM Buses (South) had been acquired by Stagecoach and re-branded Stagecoach Manchester and GM Buses (North) by FirstBus. MTL maintained the Lancashire Travel branding for the St Helens depot however MTL North fleetnames were used by St Helens from the Spring of 1998 right up to the acquisition of MTL by Arriva in February 2000.

Southport & District
Southport & District was a re-branding of Merseybus services in the Southport and Formby area, and was part of a general exercise to introduce local branding at MTL in 1994.

Wirral Peninsula Buses
Wirral Peninsula Buses was another of MTL's brand names, introduced in 1994 for services in the Wirral area. The Wirral company was based at Laird Street, Birkenhead, Wirral and now the bus Depot is owned by Arriva North West.

St Helens Rider
St Helens Rider was an earlier branding exercise, introduced in the summer of 1993 for Merseybus services 33 and 44 in St Helens. These routes were facing large amounts of competition from a number of smaller operations in the town and the St Helens Rider operation was relatively short-lived, being quietly dropped around the time the Lancashire Travel branding was adopted by St Helens depot in autumn of 1993.

Blue Triangle
Bootle-based 'Forrest' (trading as 'Blue Triangle') was formed by former Merseyside Transport driver David Forrest in the late summer of 1988, initially focusing on Merseytravel contracts with a small fleet of second hand vehicles. By the late summer/autumn of 1992, however, the company would begin new commercial operations of its own, running into competition with Merseytravel-contracted services, and soon enough, into direct competition with MTL itself on two of its routes. By 1993 the Blue Triangle fleet had increased to over 20 vehicles, including a wide variety of vehicle types such as ex-London Regional Transport Routemasters, former Merseyside Transport 'Jumbo' Atlanteans repatriated from Isle of Man Transport, and two brand-new K-registered Plaxton Pointer bodied Dennis Darts, the first of their type to operate in Liverpool.

In the spring of 1994, MTL acquired Blue Triangle, merging the company into the MerseyRider operation then-based at Speke depot and some of the competing commercial services were either withdrawn or merged into existing MTL services. Excluding the Dennis Darts, the majority of the Blue Triangle fleet was either sold on or scrapped, though one former Blue Triangle Routemaster was kept by MTL for a short-lived 'hop-on-hop-off' tour in Liverpool operated by MTL's 'Sightseers' division in the mid-1990s.
David Forrest would go on to form a number of new bus companies following this, eventually forming 'Blue Triangle Motor Services' in late 1996, but was asked to stop using the name as MTL still owned it. It was changed to Merseypride Motor Services of Bootle which would become Liverpool Motor Services in 1999 and would be a become a small part of Ace Travel. Like the original Blue Triangle operation, it operated a mixture of commercial and Merseytravel services as well as the contract for City Sightseeing's 'hop-on-hop-off' tour in Liverpool. Ace Travel ceased trading in 2015 as a result of a HM Revenue and Customs winding-up order against the company, with debts against the company totalling £220,000 over the course of eighteen months.

Liverbus/MTL Liverbus

Originally owned by Gemsam Holdings, Liverbus was an independent operator set up by former Merseybus employees in January 1990. Initially founded with 30-40 ex-GM Buses Northern Counties/Park Royal bodied Leyland Atlanteans, Liverbus built up a network of services between its Huyton base and Liverpool city centre competing with Merseybus services from the Gillmoss and Green Lane depots. A private hire/coach excursion operation, Coach 2000, was established in the summer of 1990, along with two more routes in the autumn of 1990, both of which bypassed Liverpool city centre, using a fleet of ex London Buses MCW Metroriders.

Initially Merseybus - unlike the approach it adopted with Fareway and Liverline, did not over-saturate services competing with Liverbus. With the exception of two short-lived Merseybus services, the two operators appeared to co-exist. By 1993 Liverbus had invested in its first new vehicles, eight Northern Counties Paladin bodied Volvo B10Bs and a Northern Counties Palatine II bodied Volvo Olympian, and became involved in three long-term Merseytravel contracts and established a London operation, London Suburban Bus. Liverbus announced a significant order for new vehicles in the shape of a further four Northern Counties Paladin bodied Volvo B10Bs and two Northern Counties Palatine II bodied Volvo Olympians which had already been delivered during 1994/95.

MTL began competing with Liverbus in summer 1995, completely duplicating its entire network and a few weeks later it was soon announced MTL had acquired Gemsam Holdings. Initially the Liverbus white, red and brown livery was maintained but the announced investment did not materialise and a significant number of ex-MTL Leyland Nationals were transferred to replace the ageing Atlanteans. In 1996 the MTL cream/crimson livery along with a new fleetname, MTL Liverbus, was adopted until the appearance of the MTL North fleetname in 1998. The Huyton depot and route network was maintained until the acquisition of MTL by Arriva in 2000 who after a route revision in the spring of 2000 withdrew many of the former Liverbus routes. Arriva closed down Huyton depot in June 2006 as it was too small and operations transferred to Green Lane depot in Old Swan.

MTL London

On 26 October 1994, MTL purchased London Northern from London Regional Transport. In April 1996, MTL purchased London Suburban. In August 1998 both were sold to Metroline.

MTL Manchester

The MTL Manchester operation started in the summer of 1993 somewhat controversially sparked a bus war with GM Buses, and to a lesser extent North Western's Bee Line operation and the Greater Manchester independents. MTL Manchester eventually operated in most districts of Greater Manchester and the operation was rumoured to be in preparation for a bid for one of the North/South GM Buses companies which had been owned by Greater Manchester PTE and had been ordered to be sold and split by the Government by 1994. In turn GM Buses retaliated in the form of competition with MTL in Liverpool, Southport and the Wirral - using the Birkenhead & District branding in the town. Overall this competition was damaging to both MTL and GM Buses North/South who ultimately were making losses and an even more controversial 'gentlemen's agreement' between MTL, GM Buses North/South in June 1995.

MTL North
MTL North branding first appeared on Lancashire Travel, Merseybus, MTL Liverbus and MTL Village vehicles from the spring of 1998 and survived until MTL's acquisition by Arriva in February 2000.

Coach operations

Heysham Travel
Heysham Travel was an independent coach operator that was operating commercial bus services in and around Heysham, Lancaster and Morecambe in North Lancashire. After privatisation, MTL was keen to expand and one such opportunity was council-owned Lancaster City Transport (LCT), which was facing stiff competition from Ribble Motor Services (later Stagecoach Lancashire). As a possible lead up to taking over LCT, Heysham Travel was one of MTL's first acquisitions. However, worried about a possible takeover of LCT by MTL, Stagecoach Ribble registered duplicate services over the entire LCT network and by the early summer of 1993 had succeeded in driving LCT out of business and acquiring its asset base. Despite this, MTL retained the Heysham Travel operation, transferring in some Alexander R-Type bodied MCW Metrobuses, as well as Alexander and East Lancs bodied Leyland Atlanteans from Merseybus and secondhand Leyland National 2s, ironically purchased from Stagecoach Ribble to replace Heysham Travel's ageing coach fleet. Heysham Travel's Green, Yellow and White livery was also retained up until the late-1990s and this operation was retained by MTL. Being located at least 40–50 miles away from MTL's core operations on Merseyside, the fleet was managed at an arms' length and had few opportunities for expansion. After the acquisition of MTL by Arriva in 2000 the Heysham Travel operation was sold to Stagecoach Cumberland (t/a Stagecoach Lancaster) in April of that year.

MTL Village
Village Group Tours was a long-established coach operator based in the Garston Village area of south Liverpool, from which the 'Village' name was derived. At first they were minor players in Merseyside's bus scene, only appearing on Merseytravel contacts with a handful of ageing double-deckers. However around 1992 Village entered Liverpool's 'bus war' on a large scale, beginning extensive Monday - Saturday daytime operations on two routes between Garston and Liverpool. These south Liverpool routes were popular with students and were already a hotbed of competition between Merseybus, Liverline, North Western, Merseyline and CMT Buses. A new depot in Evans Road in Speke was used to house a fleet which by the end of 1997 had grown to around 60 vehicles, the majority of which were Leyland Titans that were proving popular with Merseybus/MTL and included some rare ex-Greater Manchester examples and B15 prototype NHG732P. Village was acquired by MTL in the spring of 1998 and despite Merseybus's Shaw Road depot in Speke being yards away from Village's, MTL kept the Village depot and ex-London Leyland Titans which fitted in well with their own large fleet of the type. The operation was renamed MTL Village and used the MTL North fleetname from 1998 onwards. Furthermore, some ex-MerseyRider/Merseybus services were transferred to MTL Village. When MTL was acquired by Arriva the Evans Road garage was quickly vacated and many of the services rationalised when they revised the MTL service network in April 2000.

References

External links

Defunct transport companies of the United Kingdom
Former London bus operators
Former PTE bus operators
Historic transport in Merseyside
1992 establishments in England
2000 disestablishments in England
Former bus operators in Merseyside
Former bus operators in Greater Manchester
Former bus operators in Lancashire
Former bus operators in Cheshire